Lena Kovacevic is a Serbian musician.

Early life 

Kovacevic was born February 25, 1982, in Belgrade. In her hometown, she studied piano at Music High School. She graduated from the Music Conservatory in Amsterdam where she focused on jazz singing.

Career 
She has performed in numerous competitions and festivals, including EXIT 2001. She collaborated with the Royal Dutch Orchestra, with whom she undertook a concert series in the Netherlands and Belgium, including an appearance in front of the Dutch queen. She performed as a soloist in a project of the American bassist Jhon Clayton. A Belgian producer Biskemijem recorded her performing Serbian traditional songs, Dense fog padnala me.

In December 2009, she released an album called Good day to sing in Belgrade.

In 2011, she was a judge for the music competition "First Voice of Serbia", which was broadcast on television First. Other judges included Vlado Georgijev and Sasa Milosevic Mare.

Her single "Pick Up" was produced by the famous producer Godfrey Diamond from New York.

References 

[1] Momentum Radio Show - Emisija #015, available online 

 
 
 
 

1982 births
Serbian musicians
Living people